Paul James Fitzpatrick (born 5 October 1965) is an English former professional footballer who scored 17 goals in 218 appearances in the Football League playing for Bolton Wanderers, Bristol City, Carlisle United, Preston North End, Leicester City, Birmingham City, Bury and Northampton Town.

Life and career
Fitzpatrick was born in Liverpool. When he left school, he joined Liverpool as a trainee, and, still as a junior, spent some time with Tranmere Rovers before signing for Bolton Wanderers in March 1985. After 18 months and 14 league games, Fitzpatrick, a central defender, joined Bristol City, where he spent two years, playing in about half City's games. Carlisle United of the Fourth Division paid £40,000 for Fitzpatrick's services in October 1988. His arrival is credited with helping to "spark a revival" which raised Carlisle from 23rd place at the end of the previous season to a mid-table position in 1989. He was Player of the Season in the 1989–90 season as the club narrowly failed to reach the play-offs. A season later, Fitzpatrick moved up two divisions to join Leicester City, where he played 27 league games in a year and a half before embarking on a tour of the lower reaches of the Football League with Birmingham City, Bury and Northampton Town and a few months in the Scottish First Division (second tier) with Hamilton Academical. He then moved into non-league football with Leicester United, Forest Green Rovers, Corby Town, a spell as assistant to Garry Birtles as manager of Gresley Rovers, and Workington.

Honours
Individual
PFA Team of the Year: 1989–90 Fourth Division

References

1965 births
Living people
Footballers from Liverpool
English footballers
Association football defenders
Liverpool F.C. players
Tranmere Rovers F.C. players
Bolton Wanderers F.C. players
Bristol City F.C. players
Carlisle United F.C. players
Preston North End F.C. players
Leicester City F.C. players
Birmingham City F.C. players
Bury F.C. players
Hamilton Academical F.C. players
Northampton Town F.C. players
Shenzhen F.C. players
Leicester United F.C. players
Forest Green Rovers F.C. players
Corby Town F.C. players
Gresley F.C. players
Workington A.F.C. players
English Football League players
Scottish Football League players
Southern Football League players
Northern Premier League players
Expatriate footballers in China